The Weimar National Assembly, officially the German National Constitutional Assembly, was the popularly elected constitutional convention and de facto parliament of Germany from 6 February 1919 to 21 May 1920. As part of its duties as the interim government, it debated and reluctantly approved the Treaty of Versailles that codified the peace terms between Germany and the victorious Allies of World War I. The Assembly drew up and approved the Weimar Constitution that was in force from 1919 to 1933 (and technically until the end of Nazi rule in 1945). With its work completed, the National Assembly was dissolved on 21 May 1920. Following the election of 6 June 1920, the new Reichstag met for the first time on 24 June 1920, taking the place of the Assembly.

Because the National Assembly convened in Weimar rather than in politically restive Berlin, the period in German history became known as the Weimar Republic.

Background

At the end of World War I, following the outbreak of the German Revolution of 1918–1919, state power lay with the Council of the People's Deputies. It was formed on 10 November by revolutionary workers' and soldiers' councils in Berlin and headed by Friedrich Ebert of the Social Democratic Party (SPD). He had been appointed German chancellor on 9 November by Maximilian von Baden, the last chancellor under the German Empire. Both von Baden and the Social Democrats called for the speedy election of a National Assembly to establish a new government for Germany. The Council decided on 30 November to hold the election on 19 January 1919. On 19 December the Reich Congress of Workers' and Soldiers' Councils also approved the decree by a clear majority.

Because of the Spartacist uprising, a general strike and the accompanying armed struggles that roiled the Reich capital from 5 to 12 January 1919, it was agreed that the National Assembly should not initially meet in Berlin. Four possible locations – Bayreuth, Nuremberg, Jena and Weimar – were considered. Friedrich Ebert favored Weimar because he wanted the victorious Allies to be reminded of Weimar Classicism, which included the writers Goethe and Schiller, while they were deliberating the terms of the peace treaty.  On 14 January 1919 the choice fell to Weimar.

Elections
The elections for the National Assembly were the first held in Germany after the introduction of women's suffrage and the lowering of the legal voting age from 25 to 20 years. Together the changes raised the number of eligible voters by around 20 million. The turnout was 83%, a slightly lower percentage than in the last Reichstag elections in 1912, but a much greater absolute turnout due to the expanded suffrage. Among women the turnout was 90%. The Communist Party of Germany (KPD), founded in December 1918, boycotted the elections.

The election for the National Assembly resulted in the SPD receiving the most votes at 38%, followed by the Catholic Centre Party (which in this election ran as the Christian People's Party) with 20%, the liberal German Democratic Party (DDP) 19%, the national-conservative German National People's Party (DNVP) 10% and the more leftist and antiwar breakaway from the SPD, the Independent Social Democratic Party (USPD), 8%. Numerous small parties made up the remainder. Out of a total of 416 delegates 36 were women, although this increased to 41 during the term of the Assembly. If the latter number is taken, at 10% women, the Weimar National Assembly was one of the most female parliaments of its time.

On 10 February the Assembly passed the "Law on Provisional Reich Power" to go into effect the following day. It regulated the government's powers during the transitional phase from the German Empire to the Weimar Republic. The National Assembly was to adopt a constitution and "urgently needed" Reich laws, thus allowing it to act as an interim parliament. A States' Committee served in the place of the later Reichsrat to represent the interests of the German states. The "business of the Reich" was to be conducted by a Reich president. His function was somewhat like that of the former emperor but with the restrictions that had been made to the constitution in October 1918, notably that war and peace were to be decided by Reich law, not by the head of state. The ministers appointed by the Reich president required the confidence of the National Assembly.

Assembly as provisional parliament 
The National Assembly convened at the German National Theater in Weimar on 6 February 1919. It elected the SPD politician Eduard David as its president, but because of an inter-party agreement he stepped down after just four days. On 14 February 1919 the National Assembly elected Constantin Fehrenbach, a Centre Party deputy and former vice president, as his successor.

On 11 February the National Assembly elected the previous head of government, Friedrich Ebert (SPD), as provisional Reich president. He asked Philipp Scheidemann of the SPD to form a government. The three party coalition of the SPD, the Centre Party and the DDP that he brought together in the Scheidemann cabinet came to be known as the Weimar Coalition.

Discussion of the Treaty of Versailles 

On 12 May 1919 the National Assembly met in Berlin for the first time. There it heard and then debated a statement by Minister President Philipp Scheidemann on the peace terms of the Versailles Treaty. In his speech Scheidemann, to great applause from all parties, called the Entente Powers' terms a "dictated" or "enforced" peace intended to strangle the German people. The territorial, economic and political demands would deprive Germany of the air to breathe. The conditions were unacceptable, he said, and were in stark contrast to the assurances given by U.S. President Woodrow Wilson. The Reich government could not agree to the conditions and would make counterproposals based on Wilson's 14-point program. Prussian Minister President Paul Hirsch assured the Reich government of full support on behalf of the constituent states of the German Reich and also sharply criticized the Entente's conditions. Speakers from all parties, from the USPD to the DNVP, also declared the Entente's demands unacceptable. The chairman of the liberal German People's Party (DVP) and later Reich Foreign Minister Gustav Stresemann described the peace terms of the victorious powers as "an outpouring of political sadism". Only Hugo Haase, chairman of the USPD, combined his rejection of the Entente's demands with sharp attacks on the Reich government, accusing it of having caused the current situation in the first place through its policy of enforcing a truce between political parties during the war.

The Scheidemann cabinet resigned on 20 June 1919 because of the Entente's rejection of its counterproposals and the resulting disagreement over the question of signing the Treaty of Versailles. The new Minister President, Gustav Bauer (SPD), who headed a government of the SPD and the Centre, promoted the signing of the treaty but continued to criticize individual provisions, especially those concerning the extradition of Germans to the Entente and the imposition of war guilt on Germany alone. He combined his call for approval with the comment that it would be impossible for the German Reich to fulfill all the economic conditions of the treaty and regretted that it had not been possible to extract further concessions from the Entente.

Initial vote in favor 
Speakers from the SPD and the Centre, Paul Löbe and Adolf Gröber, also condemned the treaty. They objected in particular to the statement in the Entente draft treaty that Germany was solely to blame for the war. On behalf of their parliamentary groups, however, they spoke in favor of acceptance, since the only alternative was the resumption of hostilities, which would lead to even worse consequences. Eugen Schiffer, the former Reich Finance Minister, spoke on behalf of the majority of German Democratic Party deputies against accepting the treaty. He reminded the two governing parties of Philipp Scheidemann's 12 May warning that the hand that signed the treaty would wither. He did not see that the situation had changed since then. The DNVP and DVP were also strongly opposed to the treaty. The USPD was the only opposition party to endorse its acceptance. Hugo Haase called the issue at stake a terrible dilemma for the National Assembly. Although he too sharply criticized the treaty, he pointed out, as had the representatives of the governing parties, the consequences if the treaty were rejected.

In a 22 June roll call, 237 deputies voted in favor of signing the peace treaty, 138 against, and five abstained. Of the major parties, the SPD, Centre and USPD approved, while the DDP, DNVP and DVP rejected the treaty, on both sides by large majorities of the delegates.

The Reich government informed the Entente the same day that it would sign the treaty but with reservations as to the provisions on war guilt and the extradition of Germans to the victorious countries. French Prime Minister Georges Clemenceau replied that evening on behalf of the Allied Powers that the treaty could only be accepted or rejected in its entirety.

Second vote following allied ultimatum 
At the meeting of the National Assembly on 23 June, Minister President Bauer informed the plenum of the Entente's position and stated that the government no longer had a choice; it had to sign the treaty:Let us sign, that is the proposal I have to make to you on behalf of the entire cabinet. The reasons that compel us to make the proposal are the same as yesterday, only now we are separated by a period of barely four hours before the resumption of hostilities. We could not justify a new war even if we had weapons. We are defenseless, but without defense does not mean without honor. Certainly, our enemies want to take away our honor, there is no doubt about that, but that this attempt at cutting away our honor will one day fall back on the originators, that it is not our honor that will perish in this world tragedy, that is my belief until my last breath.Eugen Schiffer (DDP) and Rudolf Heinze (DVP), whose parties had rejected the treaty the day before, explicitly stated in their speeches that the supporters of the treaty would act exclusively out of "patriotic sentiment and conviction" (Schiffer), even if they had different opinions about the right path forward. The DNVP speaker Georg Schultz, however, did not make his opinion on the issue clear.

Ratification of the treaty through the "Law on the Conclusion of Peace between Germany and the Allied and Associated Powers" finally took place on 9 July 1919 with results similar to the 22 June vote. The only exception was that the majority of the deputies of the Bavarian Peasants' League, who had abstained from the first vote, now approved the ratification law.

In part as a response to the treaty, and particularly Article 231 that assigned sole responsibility for the war to Germany, the Assembly established an inquiry into guilt for the war on 20 August 1919. Its four subcommittees were tasked with examining the causes of the war, what brought about its loss, what missed opportunities for peace had presented themselves, and if international laws had been broken. The inquiry continued for thirteen years, until the Nazi Party victory in the election of July 1932. The inquiry's findings were hampered by lack of cooperation from both the government and the military and were in general watered down and deflected blame away from Germany.

Constitutional deliberations 
On 15 November 1918 Friedrich Ebert had appointed Hugo Preuß to the Reich Office of the Interior and charged him with drafting a Reich constitution. Preuß, a teacher of constitutional law and one of the founders of the German Democratic Party, based his draft of the Weimar Constitution in large part on the Frankfurt Constitution of 1849 which was written after the German revolutions of 1848–1849 and intended for a unified Germany that did not come to pass at the time. He was influenced as well by Robert Redslob's theory of parliamentarianism, which called for a balance between the executive and legislative branches under either a monarch or the people as sovereign. After the National Assembly was seated, Preuß became a member of the constitutional committee, which was chaired by the Assembly's vice president, Conrad Haußmann of the DDP. Preuß later became known as the father of the Weimar Constitution.

During July of 1919, the Assembly moved quickly through the draft constitution with most debates concluded within a single session. On 31 July the Assembly passed the revised committee proposal for the constitution by a vote of 262 to 75, with USPD, DNVP and DVP against.

Key topics of debate were as follows:

Miscellaneous 
On 13 January 1920, while the National Assembly was negotiating the Works Councils Act, which created an obligation for companies with twenty or more employees to have works councils, a demonstration against the law took place in front of the Reichstag building. The left-wing opposition parties USPD and Communist Party, among others, had called for the demonstration because they felt the councils would lack sufficient worker representation. About 100,000 people gathered for the demonstration. Prussian security police fired into the crowd leaving 42 people dead and over 100 wounded. The Reichstag Bloodbath was the deadliest demonstration in German history.

Beginning on 30 September 1919, the National Assembly met in the renovated Reichstag building in Berlin. During the Kapp Putsch it briefly moved to Stuttgart and met there on 18 March 1920.

The National Assembly dissolved on 21 May 1920. After the Reichstag election on 6 June 1920, the Republic's first Reichstag took the place of the National Assembly.

Summary of important events and decisions

 6 February 1919 – Friedrich Ebert, as chairman of the Council of the People's Deputies, opened the first session of the National Assembly.
 10 February 1919 – Against the votes of the USPD, the Assembly passed the "Law on Provisional Reich Power". It designated the Assembly itself as the legislative power and set up the position of Reich president, who was to be in charge of "the Reich's government affairs". A States' Committee was to be created to represent Germany's constituent states.
 11 February 1919 – Friedrich Ebert was elected provisional Reich president. He asked Philipp Scheidemann to form a government.
 13 February 1919 –Scheidemann formed a government based on the Weimar Coalition.
 14 February 1919 – Konstantin Fehrenbach (Centre Party) was elected president of the National Assembly.
 27 February 1919 – The Assembly passed a law setting up a provisional military in accordance with the terms of the Armistice. By 1921 the armed forces were to be transformed into a professional army without conscripts. The number of land troops was to be cut from 800,000 to 100,000.
 4 March 1919 – The Assembly passed a law clarifying the position of imperial laws and those passed by the Council of the People's Deputies.
 12 May 1919 – The National Assembly met for a protest rally against the Treaty of Versailles. Philipp Scheidemann called it "unacceptable".
 20/21 June 1919 – The Scheidemann government resigned. The next day Gustav Bauer (SPD) formed a new government.
 22 June 1919 – With the approval of the Assembly, the new government declared itself ready to accept the Treaty of Versailles if the admission of Germany's sole responsibility for the war were dropped.
 3 July 1919 – The Assembly accepted the new national colors.
 7 July 1919 – Finance minister Matthias Erzberger (Centre Party) presented his fiscal reforms including the introduction of the first German income tax and fiscal burden sharing.
 9 July 1919 – The Assembly ratified the Treaty of Versailles and the regulatory statutes about the military occupation of the Rhineland.
 31 July 1919 – The Assembly passed the Weimar Constitution with 262 delegates voting for and 75 (USPD, DNVP and DVP) against.
 11 August 1919 – Reich President Ebert signed the constitution. It came into force on 14 August 1919. Final meeting of the Assembly in Weimar.
 30 September 1919 – First meeting of the Assembly at Berlin, after law and order were deemed to have been restored in the capital.
 17 December 1919 – The Assembly passed a law that called for a one-off wealth tax to pay for the national debt.
 18 January 1920 – The Assembly passed the law on workers' councils.
 13 March 1920 – The Assembly left Berlin as a result of the Kapp Putsch. It returned from Stuttgart seven days later.
 25/26 March 1920 – The government of Chancellor Gustav Bauer resigned. The next day President Ebert asked Hermann Müller (SPD) to form a new government.
 8 May 1920 – A law came into force establishing a security zone around parliamentary buildings in which demonstrations were not allowed.
 12 May 1920 – A law that was the basis for movie censorship came into force.
 20 May 1920 – Supported by the SPD, the majority of the Assembly called on the government to end the state of emergency in all of Germany. The government refused.
 21 May 1920 – The National Assembly dissolved. After the Reichstag election on 6 June 1920, the Republic's first Reichstag took the place of the National Assembly.

Presidents of the Weimar National Assembly

Members

See also

Herrenchiemsee convention of 1948
Parlamentarischer Rat of 1949

References

1919 establishments in Germany
1920 disestablishments in Germany
Defunct unicameral legislatures
German Revolution of 1918–1919
Constituent assemblies